William Russell Van Aken (December 1, 1912 – September 28, 1993) was a member of the Ohio House of Representatives from 1943 through 1944 and from 1947 through 1948.  He was on the Shaker Heights City Council from 1951 to 1955 serving as Mayor. A lawyer, he was president of the Ohio Bar Association (1958–1959).

References

Politicians from Cleveland
Members of the Ohio House of Representatives
Lafayette College alumni
Case Western Reserve University alumni
American people of Dutch descent
Burials at Lake View Cemetery, Cleveland
Politicians from Shaker Heights, Ohio
1912 births
1993 deaths

20th-century American politicians